Lukáš Vorlický (born 18 January 2002) is a Czech professional footballer who plays as a winger for Atalanta.

Club career
A youth product of the Czech clubs Boskovice and Zbrojovka Brno, Vorlický moved to the youth academy of the Italian club Atalanta in 2017. On 23 July 2020, he signed a professional contract with the club until 2025. He made his professional debut with Atalanta as a late substitute in a 2–1 Serie A loss to Lecce on 19 February 2023.

International career
Vorlický is a youth international for the Czech Republic, having played up to the Czech Republic U17s.

Personal life
Vorlický is the son of the Czech football manager and former player Jiří Vorlický.

Playing style
Vorlický is a strong and powerful forward, with an unpredictable style of play and a strong shot. He has earned comparisons to Josip Iličić.

References

External links
 
 Tuttocalciatori profile
 Repre.Fotbal profile
 

2002 births
Living people
People from Boskovice
Czech footballers
Czech Republic youth international footballers
Serie A players
Atalanta B.C. players
Association football wingers
Czech expatriate footballers
Czech expatriate sportspeople in Italy
Expatriate footballers in Italy